Glendora is a city in the San Gabriel Valley in Los Angeles County, California,  east of Los Angeles. As of the 2020 census, the population of Glendora was 52,558.

Known as the "Pride of the Foothills", Glendora is nestled in the foothills of the San Gabriel Mountains. Its downtown area, locally known as the Glendora Village, hosts dozens of restaurants, cafes, shops, and boutiques along Glendora Avenue with many community events scheduled throughout the year. It has been voted as one of the best and friendliest downtowns in the San Gabriel Valley for the last eight years. Glendora was incorporated on November 13, 1911, the 25th city to achieve incorporation in Los Angeles County.

Neighborhoods and residences in Glendora reflect the city's history and range from Queen Annes, to Folk Victorians, early 20th-century bungalows, to ranch style homes, to mid-rise multi-family residential complexes, to modern mansions. Glendora's most expensive neighborhoods contain many very large, secluded, estate homes with views across the San Gabriel Valley to Downtown Los Angeles. Glendora is also home to the Glendora Country Club, which includes a Robert Trent Jones Sr. 18-hole golf course that has been played by many professional golfers. 

Glendora is bordered by Azusa and the unincorporated community of Citrus to the west, San Dimas to the east and south, Covina and the unincorporated community of Charter Oak to the south, and the San Gabriel Mountains range to the north.

History

Ygnacio Palomares received the  land grant Rancho San Jose from Governor Juan Bautista Alvarado in 1837. The land included the present day cities of Pomona, Claremont, La Verne, San Dimas, and Glendora.

Like many cities in the San Gabriel Valley, Glendora was established on previously remote agricultural land when the area became connected to the outside world upon the completion of the Santa Fe Railway's main transcontinental line from Los Angeles to Chicago in May 1887. Located at the foot of the San Gabriel Mountains, Glendora was started on approximately  that were subdivided and sold by George D. Whitcomb in late March 1887. On the first day of sale, 300 lots were sold. Whitcomb was the founder of the Whitcomb Locomotive Works in Chicago and Rochelle, Illinois and had moved to California in the early 1880s. He devised the name Glendora by combining the name of his wife, Leadora Bennett Whitcomb, with the location of his home in a glen of the San Gabriel Mountains. In December 1907, the development of Glendora got a boost when passenger service opened on a new extension of the Pacific Electric Railway's Monrovia–Glendora Line which provided hourly one-seat ride service from downtown Glendora to the Pacific Electric Building at Sixth and Main in Downtown Los Angeles. Prior to its 1911 incorporation, Glendora's administrator officially occupied the office of President of Glendora.

The downtown area as it appears now is the product of years of renovation and maintenance by the city. The former opera house, movie theatre, Pacific Electric station, banks, hotels, grocery and department stores were converted into more modern commercial buildings. The original layout can be read about on the Downtown Glendora Historical Walk, by reading placards placed along Glendora Avenue (previously called Michigan Avenue). The original townsite was bounded by Sierra Madre Avenue on the north, Minnesota Avenue on the east, Ada Avenue and the railroad on the south, and Pennsylvania Avenue on the west.

Glendora used to be home to several military academies, which have since been converted into either churches or private school facilities. These academies included Brown Military Academy, now St. Lucy's Priory High School and Church of the Open Door on Sierra Madre, and Harding Military Academy, whose property is now home to North Glendora Private, a prestigious private community adjacent to Easley Canyon atop Glendora Avenue.

From 1960 to 1978, Glendora was home to Clokey Productions which produced 85 episodes of Gumby and 65 episodes of Davey and Goliath in town. In celebration of this history, Glendora hosted the first Gumby Fest in 2014 which brought thousands of people from around the country and Canada. In 2015 the 2nd GumbyFest was held at Citrus College over an entire weekend.

Several wildfires have affected the city in recent years, the most notable being the campfire triggered Colby Fire, which displaced hundreds of Glendora residents. A relief concert titled "Glendora Band Aid" was held shortly after the fire to help raise funds to assist the homeowners who lost their homes in the fire.

Glendora has an active Chamber of Commerce, established in 1903. The mission of the Glendora Chamber is to provide tools and resources to assist the business community in prospering and adapting to the economic climate, while growing membership and promoting local purchasing.

Geography

The city lies in the eastern end of the San Gabriel Valley between the San Gabriel Mountains range to the north and the South Hills to the south.

Climate

Glendora has a dry Mediterranean climate (Köppen Csa) characterized by hotter summers and slightly cooler winters than coastal areas in California. The dry weather lasts for most of the year except for the rainy season in the winter. Hot summer temperatures and warm Santa Ana winds in the fall increase the risk of wildfires in the surrounding mountains. The 2009 Morris Fire and 2015 Cabin Fire are some of the most recent wildfires affecting Glendora and nearby cities.

Demographics

2020
As of the census of 2020, there were 52,558 people, 16,887 households, and 3.01 persons per household residing in the city. The population density was 2,582 inhabitants per square mile (996.9/km). The racial makeup of the city was 70.4% White (47.9% Non-Hispanic White), 1.9% Black or African American, 0.6% Native American, 11.6% Asian, 0.3% Pacific Islander, and 7.2% from two or more races. 34.4% of the population were Hispanic or Latino of any race.

According to the 2020 United States Census, Glendora had a median household income of $96,132, with 8.3% of the population living below the federal poverty line.

2010
As of the census of 2010, there were 50,073 people, 16,819 households, and 12,866 families residing in the city. The population density was 2,581.5 inhabitants per square mile (996.8/km). The racial makeup of the city was 75.1% White (57.0% Non-Hispanic White), 1.9% Black or African American, 0.7% Native American, 8.0% Asian, 0.1% Pacific Islander, 5.2% from other races, and 4.8% from two or more races. 30.7% of the population were Hispanic or Latino of any race.

There were 16,819 households, out of which 38.6% had children under the age of 18 living with them, 60.1% were married couples living together, 12.1% had a female householder with no husband present, and 23.5% were non-families. 19.1% of all households were made up of individuals, and 7.9% had someone living alone who was 65 years of age or older. The average household size was 2.88 and the average family size was 3.30.

In the city, the age of the population was diverse, with 27.6% under the age of 18, 7.6% from 18 to 24, 29.1% from 25 to 44, 23.2% from 45 to 64, and 12.5% who were 65 years of age or older. The median age was 37 years. For every 100 females, there were 93.2 males. For every 100 females age 18 and over, there were 89.6 males.

According to the 2010 United States Census, Glendora had a median household income of $74,615, with 7.8% of the population living below the federal poverty line. More recently, the L.A. Times estimated the median household income at $81,336 based on updated figures from the U.S. Census and SCAG.

Mexican (16.3%) and German (11.3%) are the most common ancestries in Glendora. Mexico (22.1%) and the Philippines (9.0%) are the most common foreign places of birth in Glendora.

Government

City government
Glendora is run by a city council of five members. The members are elected by district and serve four-year (staggered) terms of office. Following each election, the council selects from its membership a mayor and mayor pro tem. The current mayor is Gary Boyer.

Starting in 2020, the City of Glendora will change how council members are elected by transitioning from an at-large election system to a district-based election system. This includes changing the election cycle from odd years to even years. The first phase will begin in March 2020, when representatives from Council Districts 2, 3 and 5 will be elected. The second phase will take place in 2022 when representatives from Districts 1 and 4 will be on the ballot.

Public safety services are provided by the Glendora Police Department and the Los Angeles County Fire Department.

State and federal government

Education
The city has two public school districts: Glendora Unified and Charter Oak Unified School Districts. These school districts are considered two of the best in the state and the country, consistently ranking in the top performing brackets. Both districts have schools designated as California Distinguished Schools and Gold Ribbon Schools.

Elementary schools 
 Cullen Elementary School
 La Fetra Elementary School
 Sellers Elementary School
 Stanton Elementary School
 Sutherland Elementary School
 Washington Elementary School (COUSD)
 Willow Elementary School (COUSD)

Middle schools 
 Goddard Middle School
 Sandburg Middle School

High schools 
 Glendora High School

Continuation high schools 
 Arrow Continuation High School (COUSD)
 Whitcomb Continuation High School

Private schools

 Hope Lutheran Church and School – Preschool through 8th-grade boys and girls school
 Foothill Christian School – Preschool through 8th-grade boys and girls school
 St. Lucy's Priory High School – All girls college-prep high school
 St. Dorothy School – Kindergarten through 8th grade boys and girls school

Universities and colleges
Citrus College

Public health
There are two hospitals in the city:
Foothill Presbyterian Hospital
Glendora Community Hospital

Los Angeles County also offers community health services for Glendora residents at the Monrovia Health Center and Pomona Health Center.

Culture and recreation

Cultural facilities
Haugh Performing Arts Center
Glendora Historical Society Museum
Rubel Castle, constructed by Michael Rubel
Glendora Public Library
Glendora Public Market

Glendora Big Tree Park

Festivals

Summer Concerts in the Park
Glendora Annual Chalk Fest
Earth Festival
Heritage Festival
Halloween Carnival
Glendora Christmas Parade
Annual Gumby Fest

Parks and trails

Glendora is an active community and it has an extensive system of parks, trails, and recreational programs for the community.
Big Dalton Canyon Wilderness Park and campground
Centennial Heritage Park - The site was constructed to depict a late 19th-century to early 20th-century citrus ranch and features the Hamilton House, a working print shop, and numerous antique farm implements. Also on site is the Orton Englehart workshop, dedicated to its namesake, native Glendoran and inventor of the horizontal action impact sprinkler. This sprinkler became known as the Rain Bird, revolutionized the irrigation industry, and was recognized as a historic landmark of agricultural engineering in 1990 by the American Society of Agricultural and Biological Engineers.
Finkbiner Park
Big Tree Park - Small park with a 140 years old Moreton Bay Fig tree.

Louie Pompei Memorial Sports Park
Glendora Urban Trail System
South Hills Park and wilderness trail
Colby Trail
Lower Monroe Truck Trail - Hiking and mountain biking trail.
Punk Out Trail
Mystic Canyon Trail
Glendora bougainvillea - The largest growth of Bougainvillea in the United States.
Glen Oaks Golf and Learning Center - Offers a driving range, instructional services, practice area, and the 9-hole Par 3 course itself.
Camp Cahuilla Summer Camp ("Dirt Camp") - One of the most popular of the Parks and Recreation programs offering activities to more than 500 children every summer.

The Glendora Mountain Road and Glendora Ridge Road are also common routes for cyclists and sightseers with views through the San Gabriel Mountains. These roads have also hosted stages of the international Tour of California.

Transportation

Public transit
Glendora is served by Foothill Transit which provides connections through the city and express service to downtown Los Angeles. The Metro L Line termini station at APU/Citrus College in the adjacent city of Azusa also provides a transit link to the Metro system of trains and buses. A future extension of the L Line, from its current termini in Azusa to the City of Montclair in San Bernardino County, will include a station in Glendora to be located in the southeast corner of the intersection of Ada Avenue and Vermont Avenue. The station is not expected to be in service until 2026. When it opens, the rail line will be renamed the A Line per Metro's new naming convention and will connect to the former Blue Line via the new Regional Connector in downtown Los Angeles. It will provide a "one-seat ride" (no transfers) to the Financial District of Los Angeles and downtown Long Beach.

Glendora also runs its own weekday transportation shuttle service, the Glendora Mini Bus, with shuttles serving the Metrolink Commuter Rail Station in nearby Covina, the APU/Citrus College Metro station, and an inter-school service connecting some of the city's schools. The Mini Bus also provides curb-to-curb transportation services for senior and disabled residents of Glendora.

Freeways and highways

Glendora lies at the intersection of two major freeways, the 210 and the 57, in what was formerly known as the Glendora Curve. These two freeways conveniently connect the city with the rest of the Southern California region. Historic U.S. Route 66 also traverses the city from east to west and it is an important corridor for businesses. Other major roads and highways include Foothill Boulevard, Grand Avenue, Arrow Highway, and Lone Hill Avenue.

Airports
There are no airports within the city limits. Glendora is within forty-five miles from all major area airports including Los Angeles International Airport (LAX), Hollywood Burbank Airport (BUR), Ontario International Airport (ONT), Long Beach Airport (LGB), and John Wayne Airport (SNA) in Orange County.

Economy

The National Hot Rod Association and Armstrong Garden Centers are based in Glendora.

Top employers
According to the city's 2018 Comprehensive Annual Financial Report, the top employers in the city are:

Media

Television
KGLN TV is a public-access channel under the exclusive editorial control of the City of Glendora. By law, programming and information appearing on this channel is limited to City-originated programming of Public Meetings, City-sponsored events/activities, City-originated information, and the California legislative network live cablecast for a portion of each program day.

News media
The San Gabriel Valley Tribune, based in Monrovia, provides mainstream news coverage for Glendora. and surrounding "Foothill cities." The Tribune carries a list of current articles as well as a history of articles concerning the City of Glendora and cities immediately surrounding the City of Glendora.

Library Happenings is a bi-monthly newsletter published and distributed by the Glendora Public Library. It generally consists of 4 or 6 pages of information about local programs and events planned for the year. There is an online version of the newsletter  with issues going back to the year 2007.

Glendora City News is a local news outlet focused on issues and events that are relevant to residents of the city of Glendora, California. Founded in November 2014, the newspaper has covered local crime, real estate, social events, and political issues, including some high-profile, highly controversial actions taken by city managers which have resulted in contentious public meetings and citywide calls for the removal of city politicians. The news outlet provides detailed information about scheduled events, public meetings, and incidents of note that occur within the City of Glendora.

Of particular note for Glendora residents, the news outlet contains detailed information about ballot initiatives every time the city holds a vote, listing the ballot propositions without a discernible political bias, a stance that has earned the news outlet a moderately-large on-line subscriber base as well as 18 thousand “like” subscribers on Facebook out of a city population of 50 thousand. Consistently detailing measures on the ballot at every election has made the news source a secondary source of information, with the primary source being the City of Glendora's official web sites.

The news outlet also occasionally carries information about local employment openings that have social benefit (such as environmental jobs), and routinely carries updated information about the many foothill fires and mud slides that effect residents in the northern parts of the city during the year's fire and rain seasons. Lost and found dogs and cats also get covered fairly routinely at the news outlet, with residents contacting the newspaper asking for help locating either a found pet's guardians or their missing pets.

The news outlet also offers a Community Calendar series which covers up-coming events which include city meetings as well as local events created by local shops, fast food franchises, and volunteer organizations.

The news outlet asks local residents to provide news tips and commentary about anything that happens in the city, including information about what city planners and managers are up to. In the past such tips have led to volunteer efforts by residents who have organized clean-up efforts of public property, such as the South Hills Dog Park where the drinking water facilities had been left in disrepair and needed cleaning.

Notable people

Notable people who live or have lived in Glendora, California include:
     
 Steven Barnes, science fiction and mystery author, and writer                                                              
 Chris Casamassa – martial artist
 Bryan Clay – Olympic gold medalist
 Rocky Dennis – subject of the biographical film Mask
 Soleil Moon Frye – Punky Brewster actress
 Ron Gallemore – neurosurgeon
 Cliff Hamlow – former Glendora mayor (2004-2005)
 John Harrold – former Glendora mayor (2001-2002)
 Casey Jacobsen – basketball player
 David Klein – inventor of Jelly Belly candy
 D. Wayne Lukas – racehorse trainer
 Gabrial McNair – No Doubt keyboardist
 José Mota – Spanish radio announcer for the Anaheim Angels and son of Manny Mota
 Tracy Murray – former basketball player
 Anna Nalick – singer
 Vince Neil – singer
 Adam Plutko - baseball player
 Sally Rand – actress and dancer
 Raylene – pornographic actress
 Tony Robbins – motivational speaker
 Aaron Rowand – baseball player
 Misty Rowe – actress on Hee Haw
 Julie Smith – Olympic gold medalist
 Lynsi Snyder – owner of In-N-Out Burger
 Alex Solis – jockey
 Woody Strode – actor, American football player
 The Surfaris – surf music band
 Douglas F. Tessitor – mayor 2006-7
 Deontay Wilder - World Heavy Weight Champion 2015-2020
 George Dexter Whitcomb – founder of Glendora
 Shawn Wooten – baseball player
 DJ Peters – baseball player

Sister cities
  Moka, Japan
Since about 2000, there has been an ongoing student exchange program between Goddard Middle School and Moka Higashi Junior High School. There is an ongoing student exchange program between Sandburg Middle School and Nakamura Junior High School.
  Mérida, Yucatán, Mexico

See also

References

External links

 

 
Cities in Los Angeles County, California
Communities in the San Gabriel Valley
Incorporated cities and towns in California
1887 establishments in California
1911 establishments in California
Populated places established in 1887
Populated places established in 1911